Poříčí nad Sázavou is a municipality and village in Benešov District in the Central Bohemian Region of the Czech Republic. It has about 1,400 inhabitants.

Administrative parts
The village of Hvozdec is an administrative part of Poříčí nad Sázavou.

Geography
It lies in the Benešov Uplands. The Sázava River flows through the municipality.

History
The first written mention of Poříčí nad Sázavou is from 1351.

Transport
The I/3 road, which is part of the European route E55, passes through Poříčí nad Sázavou.

Sights
Poříčí nad Sázavou is known for two valuable Romanesque churches. The Church of Saint Peter probably dates from the mid-12th century and was restored in 1677. The Church of Saint Gall was built in the mid-13th century. Gothic and Baroque modifications took place after 1620 and in 1745.

Notable people
Josef Topol (1935–2015), playwright

References

External links

Villages in Benešov District